Sphoeroides andersonianus is a species of pufferfish in the family Tetraodontidae. It is a tropical marine species native to the Eastern Pacific. FishBase notes that a better reference is needed to determine additional information on the species.

References 

Tetraodontidae